Mart Sander (born 10 August 1967) is an Estonian singer, actor, director, author, artist, and television host.

Life and career
In his youth, Mart Sander studied violin and conducting. He started singing in the choir of the Estonian National Opera at the age of eighteen. At the age of nineteen, Sander and swing orchestra Modern Fox won a talent competition in Moscow, the band toured both in Soviet Union and in Europe. He obtained his BA in musicology from the Tallinn University, his MA in film and TV directing at the BFM (Baltic Film and Media School) and is currently doing his PhD at the BFM, also lecturing on film music semiotics. He has also studied screenwriting at the London Film Academy. Member of Estonian Writers' Union and Estonian Association of Audiovisual Authors.

Stage
The notable roles for Sander include: directing the operetta Silva (Die Czardasfürstin) at the Estonian National Opera in 2010.  At the opening night, as the leading singer suffered an injury on the stage, Sander took over the part. In 2014, his production of Ball im Savoy opened at the Estonian National Opera; Sander directed, revised the text, made new orchestral arrangements and provided set and costume design, as well as created the role of Mustafa.

Sander has written stage plays, where he often stars himself, such as Behind the Random Denominator (in Estonian, Juhuslik nimetaja), which was presented to the New York audience in 2015 and The Bughouse (in Estonian, Äratõmbetuli), which premiered in Washington, D.C. in 2018. On 17 June 2018, The Bughouse premiered at the Estonian State Drama Theatre.

Film and television
Sander has directed and acted in films and the short TV movie Berlin 1945: Musik Unter Bomben (2007). He made his feature film debut as Martti in the 1991 Juha Tapaninen-directed Finnish musical-comedy Iskelmäprinssi. In 1998, he had a role in the Rao Heidmets-directed comedy-family film Kallis härra Q (English release title: Dear Mister Moon), based on the 1992 children's book of the same name by Estonian author Aino Pervik. He had roles in the Hungarian film Why Wasn't He There? and in the US made-for-cable production Candles in the Dark, opposite Alyssa Milano and directed by Maximilian Schell.

Sander's Estonian TV appearances include hosting the Eurolaul 1993 and the TV series Tantsud tähtedega (Dancing with the Stars). He also hosted  (Stars in the Music) from 1997 to 2006 and again from 2008 to 2010, as well as the hit show Su nägu kõlab tuttavalt (Sing Your Face Off). In 2012, he was a judge on the fifth season of the TV3 reality series competition Eesti otsib superstaari (Pop Idol Estonia). In 2020, he became the host of the Estonian version of the global TV phenomenon Maskis Laulja (The Masked Singer).

In 2015, Sander took his own one man horror drama Behind the Random Denominator (which he wrote, directed and starred in) to the solo theatre festival United Solo in New York, earning him the Best Sound Design award. The film version of the play became Sander's directorial debut feature. The film premiered at the Haapsalu horror and fantasy film festival HÕFF. It later won Sander his first Best Director award at the 9th Nice International Film Festival  and Best Lead Actor award at the Madrid International Film Festival, where he won against such stars as Laurence Fishburne and Bruno Ganz. In 2018, his short Actually premiered at the HÕFF. This film won the Award of Excellence at the Global Shorts Film Festival in Los Angeles, USA in September 2018 and was awarded The Best Horror Short at the Venice RAGFF Film Festival in December 2018. In January 2019, the film received two awards from Cinema World Fest Awards and in June won the Short Film Factory festival in Romania. Also in 2018, he wrote and directed an ambitious 10-part historical TV series The Whores, which is considered the most internationally successful Estonian TV production, as well as a TV movie The Bughouse (in Estonian, Äratõmbetuli), based on his own stage play. 
On 13 December 2019, his horror-fantasy anthology Eerie Fairy Tales, based on the short story collection of the same name by Sander himself, opened nationwide in Estonia and in limited cinemas in the Baltic states and Finland, gathering positive reviews. In January 2020, the film won Best Original Score award at the Canadian Cinematography Awards  and Best Story award at the London International Film Festival. In April, it won Best Feature Film and Original Score awards at the New York Movie Awards. In May, the film was awarded the Best Genre Film award at the HÕFF (major Estonian film festival), Best Original Screenplay and Best Original Score awards at the Hollywood Blood Horror Festival  and two awards at the Cult Critic Movie Awards, May edition - Best Genre Film and Best Film Score. In June, Sander's film won Best Film and Best Director awards at the Nice International Film Festival 2020. In August, the film was the opening feature of the Moscow International Esoteric Film Festival and won the Best Film award. It went on to win two Best Horror Film awards - at the Unrestricted View Film Festival (UK), November 2020, and at the World Film Fair (USA), December 2020. Both films were released internationally on 28 September 2021, by BayView Entertainment.

In 2020, Sander wrote and directed a feature film titled The Kennedy Incident, based on his own novel. The film is an account of the romantic and politically charged adventures of the future president John F Kennedy during his trip to Tallinn, Estonia, in the summer of 1939. This film premiered on 17 February 2021, at the Santa Fe Film Festival, as the opening film, and won the Best Picture award. In March, it won Best Feature Thriller and Best Actress (Lisette Pomerants) awards at the Europa Film Festival, Barcelona, and in September the Best Feature Film award at the Anatolia International Film Festival. In October, the film won Best Feature Film and Best Director Feature Film awards at the Sweden Film Awards  and was nominated Best Film at the Venice TV Awards, where it finished second. The international release of The Kennedy Incident was delayed due to the pandemic and is scheduled for distribution by Indican Pictures in June 2023.

Sander premiered his mystery-thriller The Sixth Secret, based on his own original screenplay, at the Dark Nights Film Festival (the only A-list film festival in Estonia) on May 1 and won the Audience Award. The film gathered positive reviews. In July, the movie leaked to all major pirating sites and went viral, reaching #2 on YTS.mx on July 6. It subsequently sky rocketed on the IMDB, where it became #1 Estonian film by popularity, with Mart Sander himself ranking as #2 on the list of most popular Estonian film personalities. The film was released internationally on January 10, 2023, by Gravitas Ventures.

On January 2, 2023, his short film, Universe 4, premiered at the Norway Fjords International Film Festival and was awarded Best Narrative Short.

Conducting and recording
In 2000, Sander helped establish, and began to conduct, the Tallinn-based Bel-Etage Concert Orchestra.  In 2004, Sander and Bel-Etage released their first album in Great Britain entitled The Monckton Album, with selections from three musicals composed by Lionel Monckton, on the Divine Art Records label. This album won the 'Critics' Choice' Award from Gramophone. It was followed by The Finck Album, dedicated to the music by Herman Finck.

In 2005, Sander established the Swing Swindlers dance orchestra; in 2005, the Swing Swindlers issued an album in the UK called Five-Fifteen: A Tribute to the BBC Dance Orchestra.

In February 2018, The Swing Swindlers visited the US, as part of the celebrations of Estonia's centennial. The mayor of Washington, D.C. declared 24 February official 'Estonia Day', mentioning a concert by Mart Sander in her proclamation. On 26 February 2018, The Swing Swindlers gave a concert at the Kennedy Center, Washington DC.

After the passing of HRH Queen Elizabeth, Sander was interviewed by Estonian newspapers because he had met the monarch on several occasions and had been commended by Her Majesty for his efforts in promoting British music, particularly the works of Gilbert and Sullivan, in Estonia.  Sander recalled that when he sent his recording of Leslie Stuart's Soldiers of the Queen to Her Majesty, he received a letter of thanks from Buckingham Palace. When they met at a reception during Her Majesty's visit to Estonia, she was well-informed about Sander's musical career and spent nearly two minutes speaking with him.

Writing and painting

As of 2022, Sander has written eight novels in Estonian and English. Sander's novel Litsid (The Whores) was the best-seller with the book dealer "Apollo" and at number two with the dealer Rahva Raamat for week 32 in 2015. Part II was published in 2017; in the Estonian Libraries Most Checked-Out Books in 2017 list, parts I and II occupied first and second position. Part III was published in December 2019. Sander has created, scripted and directed a historical drama series based on this trilogy. Season I premiered on Estonia's TV3 in February 2018. At the Estonian Entertainment Awards 2018, The Whores was nominated in two categories (Best TV Series Of The Year and Best Actress Of The Year - Merle Palmiste won for her leading role in the series). In April 2019, it was announced that the series has been purchased by the US, Russian and Spanish distributors. For the Estonian Film and TV Awards (EFTA) 2019, The Whores was nominated in three categories: Best TV Series, Best Actress (Merle Palmiste) and Best Script (Mart Sander). It won the Best TV Series of 2018 award. In September 2019, US film and TV site WeAreCult published a positive review of the series, predicting it "could grab a Downton Abbey-esque following due to the period trappings and compelling dramatic through-line". The second season The Women's War was launched on Go3 in November 2020.

Sander's collection of short stories Eerie Fairy Tales (with author's illustrations) hit the shelves on 1 May 2019, and finished the first week as #5 on the best seller list, remaining on the Top Ten List for five weeks. It was soon turned into a feature film, which premiered on 13 December 2019. The third book in The Whores - series was launched on 14 December 2019. The international rights to the novel trilogy have been acquired by the Scandinavian media giant Bonnier Group; the first to publish the translation is the oldest and largest Finnish publishing company, WSOY, who launched the series early in 2022.

Sander's new young adult magical realism novel Ravengold was released for Christmas 2022 and finished the first week on the best seller list (#2 in Youth Literature, #6 overall), climbing to #1 in Youth Literature on the first week of January, 2023. His massive historical novel The Goddess of the Devil is scheduled for international release in 2023; the book was the finalist for the CYGNUS Book Awards for Science Fiction in 2020.

Sander became the member of the Estonian Writers' Association in 2022. 

Sander's first solo exhibition took place in Tallinn in July and August 2008, followed by similar exhibitions in 2009 and 2010. He opened his own art gallery in 2007 in the center of Tallinn. In 2012, Sander's art gallery was involved in a case involving art forgeries; charges were brought against one of the assistants working in the gallery. On 21 December 2012, his exhibition Appocalypse Formula opened in Tallinn. He has also had personal exhibitions in Moscow and Saint Petersburg. His painting Urban Hunter made it to the finals of the 10th Annual ARC Salon (2013-2014), the largest and most prestigious competition in the western world for realist artists. His Officer Of the Napoleonic Wars was the finalist of the 14th Salon (2019).

Personal
As a teenager Sander became interested in Catholicism, and was baptised. His baptismal name is Martin Laurent.

Notes

External links 

An article about Mart Sander's stage work, in Estonian
See Mart Sander singing 'The Eyes of the World'.
Berlin 1945: Musik Unter Bomben – trailer.

1967 births
Living people
20th-century Estonian male actors
20th-century Estonian painters
20th-century Estonian male artists
21st-century Estonian male actors
21st-century Estonian painters
Estonian Roman Catholics
20th-century Estonian male singers
Estonian male musical theatre actors
Estonian male film actors
Estonian male television actors
Estonian television personalities
Male actors from Tallinn
Artists from Tallinn
Singers from Tallinn